Lungotevere degli Anguillara is the stretch of Lungotevere that links Piazza Giuseppe Gioachino Belli to Lungotevere degli Alberteschi in Rome (Italy), in the Rione Trastevere.

The Lungotevere takes its name from the powerful House of Anguillara (lords in Rome until the end of 15th century), that owned a palace and a tower in the area.

Until 1886 the name of the Lungotevere was Cestio, due to its vicinity to Ponte Cestio, that links the Lungotevere to Tiber Island.

Notes

Bibliography 

Anguillara
Streets in Rome R. XIII Trastevere